The flag of Nenets Autonomous Okrug, in the Russian Federation, is a white field charged with green stripe and a blue ornament strand (a Tyumen crown, seen also on the flag of Yamalo-Nenets Autonomous Okrug) near the bottom. A blue stripe separates the bottom most green stripe from the ornament.

The flag was adopted as the winning design of a competition on 25 September 2003. The proportions are 2:3.

References
Flags of the World

Flag
Flags of the federal subjects of Russia
Nenets Autonomous Okrug
Nenets
Nenets Autonomous Okrug